The Shropshire Hills is a designated Area of Outstanding Natural Beauty (AONB) in Shropshire, England. It is located in the south of the county, extending to its border with Wales. Designated in 1958, the area encompasses  of land primarily in south-west Shropshire, taking its name from the upland region of the Shropshire Hills. The A49 road and Welsh Marches Railway Line bisect the area north–south, passing through or near Shrewsbury, Church Stretton, Craven Arms and Ludlow.

Hills 
This gives Shropshire the 13th highest hill per county in England.

More accessible hills are the Long Mynd, which covers an area of 5,436 acres (22.0 km2) and peaks at Pole Bank at a height of 516 metres (1,693 feet), is near Church Stretton. It includes Carding Mill Valley, a popular recreational area which was developed as a honeypot to draw tourists away from the more sensitive/protected areas of the Mynd. One of the most famous hills is the Caer Caradoc, at 459 metres (1,506 ft) which is just by the village of All Stretton. The Wrekin, located in the far northeastern panhandle of the AONB, is an extremely popular hill with a well-used trail. Located near Wellington, its position close to the major population centres of Shropshire, and good transport links (A5/M54) make it easy to access. Ercall Hill, a notable geological site, is located just to the north of The Wrekin.

Another prominent hill is Corndon Hill, whose summit is in Wales.

Towns and villages

The largest town in the AONB is Church Stretton (sometimes known as "Little Switzerland"), with a population of about 3,000. The only other town within the boundaries of the AONB is Clun, with fewer than 1,000 people, in the Clun Valley.
 
Ludlow, the largest town in South Shropshire, lies just south of the AONB. The Shropshire Hills AONB Partnership is based at Craven Arms, just outside the development restriction boundaries. Bishop's Castle is a small town of about 1,500 people, located near the Welsh border to the west. Bucknell is a notable village in the south. Knighton is across the River Teme in Wales, but its station is within the Shropshire Hills AONB.

Local authorities
The AONB falls largely within the Shropshire Council area. Its north-easternmost extremity, in the vicinity of the prominent Wrekin hill, is located in the borough of Telford & Wrekin.

Rivers

 River Clun – starting at Anchor, ends up joining the Teme
 Cound Brook – Rises from minor watercourses running off the Long Mynd and Caer Caradoc before discharging into the River Severn
 River Teme – flows through Knighton down to Bucknell then Ludlow, before passing into Herefordshire
 River Rea – flows north to south, passes through Cleobury Mortimer

Historical attractions

Attractions of historical interest located within or near the AONB include Stokesay Castle (near Craven Arms), a well-preserved fortified manor house.

Ludlow Castle in Ludlow was constructed in the 11th century as the border stronghold of one of the Marcher Lords, Roger de Lacy.

Offa's Dyke, a massive linear earthwork, also runs through the area, and across the Clun Valley area.

Clun Castle is located near Clun.

Wildlife

Peregrine falcon
Dipper
Ring ouzel
Merlin
Curlew
Tree sparrow
Pied flycatcher
Barn owl
Red fox
Badger
Red grouse
Turtle dove
Buzzard
Common snipe
Northern lapwing
Common redshank
Red Kite
Pine Marten
Raven
European goldfinch

Other attractions

 Clun Forest – remote area of woodland and hills
 Wyre Forest – large woodland, half of which is in Shropshire, the other half in Worcestershire

References

External links
Shropshire Hills AONB

Church Stretton
Hills of Shropshire
Areas of Outstanding Natural Beauty in England
Volcanism of England
Volcanism of Wales
Volcanism of Great Britain
Proterozoic volcanism
Protected areas established in 1958
Protected areas of Shropshire
Tourist attractions in Shropshire
Telford and Wrekin